Dorsey/Apache Blvd is a station on the Metro light rail line in Tempe, Arizona, United States.  A surface park and ride lot is available on the north side of Apache Boulevard.

Following the opening of the Tempe Streetcar line on May 20, 2022, the station serves as the eastern terminus and a transit point between the Streetcar line and the Valley Metro Rail line. Tempe Streetcar trams arrive and depart from the side platform to the south, whilst Valley Metro Rail trains continue to arrive and depart from the island platform to the north.

Ridership

Notable places nearby 
 The New School for the Arts and Academics (NSAA)

References

External links 
 Valley Metro map

Valley Metro Rail stations
Railway stations in the United States opened in 2008
2008 establishments in Arizona
Buildings and structures in Tempe, Arizona